St. Mary's Church, Westwood is a parish church in the Church of England in Jacksdale, Nottinghamshire.

History
The church was built in 1898 to the designs of the architect Percy Heylyn Currey to serve the expanding mining villages. Francis Cowper, 7th Earl Cowper provided the land and James Oakes provided funding. The church cost £2,000.

Although the church is in Jacksdale, it takes its name from the village of Westwood where services were held at the village school for 30 years before the church was built.

Current parish status
It is a daughter church to St. Helen's Church, Selston.

Notes

Churches completed in 1898
19th-century Church of England church buildings
Westwood
1898 establishments in England